Lanthanum(III) nitrate is a water soluble salt of lanthanum with the chemical formula . The compound decomposes at 499°C to lanthanum oxide, nitric oxide and oxygen.

Uses
It is a starting chemical for the electrochemical synthesis of lanthanum permanganate and to make lanthanum oxysulfide. It is also a possible application for fluorescent display tubes.

Preparation
Lanthanum nitrate is prepared by reacting lanthanum oxide with nitric acid which creates lanthanum(III) nitrate and water.

 La2O3 + 6HNO3 -> 2La(NO3)3 + 3H2O

References

Lanthanum compounds 
Nitrates